Third Partition may refer to:
Third Partition of Poland, 1795
Third Partition of Luxembourg, 1839